Yttertavle is a small locality situated in Umeå Municipality, Västerbotten County, Sweden, with 75 inhabitants in 2005.

External links 
 http://www.yttertavle.se

Populated places in Västerbotten County